The 1993 Scotts Mills earthquake, also known as the "Spring break quake", occurred in the U.S. state of Oregon on March 25 at 5:34 AM Pacific Standard Time. With a moment magnitude of 5.6 and a maximum perceived intensity of VII (Very strong) on the Mercalli intensity scale, it was the largest earthquake in the Pacific Northwest since the Elk Lake and Goat Rocks earthquakes of 1981. Ground motion was widely felt in Oregon's Willamette Valley, the Portland metropolitan area, and as far north as the Puget Sound area near Seattle, Washington.

Earthquake
The United States Geological Survey reported that strong motion instruments recorded peak ground accelerations of 0.06 g at Detroit Dam,  to the southeast, and also give an extensive review of damage reports and ground motion intensities.

The seismology lab from the University of Washington in Seattle reported the Richter magnitude to be 5.4, but stated that the initial figure could change. An aftershock measuring 3.2 happened within the first hour of the main shock.

Damage
Most structural damage consisted of toppled chimneys and failure of walls of unreinforced masonry. Buildings with damage include Molalla High School,  the State Capitol in Salem, and the St. Paul Church in Saint Paul. The damage at the capitol occurred in the old wing and that section of the facility was closed after the morning earthquake, and two walls at the high school were partially collapsed. Additional damage to some homes occurred in Molalla in the form of broken windows and brick planters at some homes there. No damage was reported in Portland, but residents did see books knocked off shelves and some car alarms were set off. Several people were treated at the Salem Hospital for injuries related to falling glass.

Previous events

A similar sized earthquake occurred in 1877 and Portland was struck by a magnitude 5.5 quake in 1962, but geophysicists say the area is vulnerable to even larger earthquakes, such as the 1872 North Cascades earthquake.

See also
List of earthquakes in 1993
List of earthquakes in the United States
1993 Klamath Falls earthquakes

References

External links
Increased seismic activity in Oregon highlighted by tremor and a M=4.0 quake – Temblor, Inc.

1993 in Oregon
1993 in Washington (state)
1993 earthquakes
Clackamas County, Oregon
1993
Marion County, Oregon
1993 natural disasters in the United States